Raffaela Salmaso (born 16 April 1968) is an Italian football coach and former defender, who represented the Italy women's national football team at the 1991 FIFA Women's World Cup.

Despite playing in defence, Salmaso netted around a dozen goals per season as she won four Serie A titles with four different clubs.

Salmaso was a member of the Italy women's national football team from 1990 until 1997, and scored Italy's first goal in their 1991 FIFA Women's World Cup quarter final defeat to Norway. She retired from international football after playing in Italy's 2–0 UEFA Women's Euro 1997 final defeat to Germany.

References

External links

1968 births
Living people
People from Dolo
Italian women's footballers
Italy women's international footballers
1991 FIFA Women's World Cup players
Serie A (women's football) players
Women's association football defenders
Women's association football midfielders
A.S.D. Reggiana Calcio Femminile players
Sportspeople from the Metropolitan City of Venice
ACF Milan 82 players
Footballers from Veneto